Race Course may refer to:

 Race Course, Jamaica, a settlement in Clarendon Parish in Jamaica
 Race Course, Vadodara, an area on the western side of Vadodara City in the state of Gujarat in India

See also
 Racecourse (disambiguation)